The Eagles Mere Railroad was a  narrow gauge railroad in Sullivan County, Pennsylvania, built in 1892 to connect the resort of Eagles Mere with the standard gauge Williamsport and North Branch Railroad at Sonestown,  away by rail. It was leased to the connecting Williamsport & North Branch in 1901, which continued to operate it as a narrow gauge, and extended it in 1902–3 to Eagles Mere Park and a connection with the narrow gauge Susquehanna and Eagles Mere Railroad, a logging railroad. The line went through a receivership and reorganization in 1911–2, and a second in 1920, due to increasing competition with automobiles for traffic to Eagles Mere. It was reorganized again in 1922 as the Eagles Mere Railway, operating independently of the W&NB, but ended passenger service in 1923 and freight service in 1927. It was abandoned in 1928.

Notes

References

Defunct Pennsylvania railroads
Transportation in Sullivan County, Pennsylvania
Narrow gauge railroads in Pennsylvania
3 ft gauge railways in the United States
Railway companies established in 1891
Railway companies disestablished in 1928